Världens bästa lotta is an album from the Swedish dansband and pop singer Lotta Engberg. It was released on 22 March 2006 and is a double CD collection of some of Lotta's hits throughout the years. Some of the songs on the record are performed by her as a solo artist, others together with the bands Lotta & Anders Engbergs Orkester and Lotta Engbergs. The album peaked at number 17 on the Swedish Albums Chart.

Track listing

CD 1
"Genom vatten och eld" - 3:47
"100%" (with Triple & Touch) - 2.58
"Kan man gifta sig i jeans?" - 2:59
"Alla lyckliga stunder" - 3:40
"Juliette & Jonathan" - 3:02
"Kär och galen" - 3:00
"Leva livet" ("It's My Party") - 2.16
"Du ger mig av din kärlek" ("Love Is All Around") - 3:40
"Fernando" - 4:06
"Tusen vackra bilder" - 3:44
"Fyra Bugg & en Coca Cola" - 3:00
"Bang en boomerang" - 2:57
"En gång till" - 2:53
"Därför älskar jag dig" (duet with Umberto Marcato) - 3:40
"Tusen skäl att stanna" - 3:44
"Håll om mig nu" - 3:29
"Sången han sjöng var min egen" ("Killing Me Softly with His Song") - 3:15
"Smoke Gets in Your Eyes" - 4:26

CD 2
"Världens lyckligaste par" (duet with Olle Jönsson) - 3:26
"Sån't är livet" ("You Can Have Her") - 3:02
"Vilken härlig dag" - 2:32
"Dröm om mig" ("Save Your Love") - 2:52 (duet Lotta Engberg-Peter Åhs)
"På min sommaräng" ("My Boy Lollipop") - 2:56
"Tennessee Waltz" - 2:17
"Världens bästa servitris" - 3:20
"Jag önskar att det alltid vore sommar" ("It Might As Well Rain Until September") - 3:24
"Tjejer & snubbar, kärringar & gubbar" - 3:21
"Melodin" - 3:01
"När du tar mig i din famn" - 3:54
"True Love" (duet with Peter Åhs) - 3:47
"Ringen på mitt finger" - 3:05
"Åh vad jag älskade dig just då" - 3:00
"Succéschottis" - 3:00
"Blå, blå är himmelen" - 3:08
"Allt jag vill säga" - 2:51
"En liten stund på Jorden" - 3:18

Charts

References

2006 compilation albums
Compilation albums by Swedish artists
Lotta Engberg albums
EMI Music Sweden compilation albums